The men's tournament of football at the 2009 Summer Universiade at  Serbia began on June 30 and ended on July 10.

Teams

Preliminary round

Group A

Group B

Group C

Group D

Classification 9-16 places

Quarterfinals

Classification round

Classification 13-16 places

Classification 9-12 places

Classification 5-8 places

Semifinals

Finals

Final 15-16 places

Final 13-14 places

Final 11-12 places

Final 9-10 places

Final 7-8 places

Final 5-6 places

Bronze-medal match

Gold-medal match

Final standings

Goalscorers

7 goals
  Kensuke Nagai
6 goals
  Joao Cesar Sales Jr.
4 goals
  David O'sullvian
  Mario Ramaglia
  Francisco Ribeiro Jr.
  James Scholefield

External links
Reports

Football at the 2009 Summer Universiade